Kouloukonas is a former municipality in the Rethymno regional unit, Crete, Greece. Since the 2011 local government reform it is part of the municipality Mylopotamos, of which it is a municipal unit. Population 5,469 (2011). The seat of the municipality was in Garazo.

References

Populated places in Rethymno (regional unit)